Royal Cleaves Johnson (October 3, 1882 – August 2, 1939) was a U.S. Representative from South Dakota and a highly decorated veteran of World War I while he was still a member of Congress. Despite voting against United States declaration of war on Germany, he took a leave of absence from Congress to enlist. He became a highly decorated veteran receiving the Distinguished Service Cross from the United States government. He also received the War Cross 1914–1918 from the French government.

Early life and education
Royal Cleaves Johnson was born in Cherokee, Iowa in 1882. He moved with his parents to Highmore, South Dakota in 1883, and attended the public schools. He graduated from the University of South Dakota School of Law in 1906, and was admitted to the bar that same year.

Career
He started his practice in Highmore. He became the assistant state's attorney for Hyde County in 1906, and State's Attorney in 1908 and 1909. In 1910, he became the Attorney General of South Dakota. In 1913, he moved to Aberdeen, South Dakota and returned to private practice. He was elected to the United States House of Representatives in 1915, serving through the end of the Seventy-Second Congress in 1932.  He was the chairman for the Committee on Expenditures in the Department of War (1921–1925), and the Committee on World War Veteran's Legislation (1929–1932). He was not a candidate for reelection in 1932.

World War I
In 1918, even though he had on April 5, 1917, voted against declaring war on Germany, he absented himself from the Congress and enlisted in the United States Army to fight in World War I. He served in the 313th Infantry Regiment as a private, sergeant, second lieutenant, and first lieutenant. In Montfaucon, France, on the 26th and 27 September 1918, he was involved in a combat situation wherein he repeatedly exposed himself to enemy fire and was wounded by an exploding shell. Although severely wounded, he accompanied two of his fellow soldiers to the rear and refused space in an ambulance until his comrades were cared for. For this, he received the Distinguished Service Cross from the United States government, the citation for which reads:

He also received the Croix de Guerre with gold star from the Republic of France.

The American Legion
After Johnson returned from the war, he resumed his seat in Congress. Johnson was the House sponsor of legislation to create a federal charter for The American Legion. The Senate co-sponsor was Sen. Josiah Wolcott of Delaware. The bill was filed on June 27, 1919, passed the House on August 27, passed the Senate on September 5 and was signed by President Wilson on September 16, 1919.

Later life
In 1930, in a speech before the US War Policies Commission, Johnson advocated for legislation that called for the mandatory conscription of "everything", including all private property and all United States citizens, should war be declared. The proposal was intended to address war profiteering, in solidarity with members of the American armed forces.

Upon retiring from the House, Johnson continued to practice law in Washington, D.C., until his death there in 1939. He was buried at Arlington National Cemetery. In 1953 he was posthumously awarded the Distinguished Service Medal by The American Legion.

Legacy
The Veterans Administration hospital in Sioux Falls, South Dakota, The Royal C. Johnson Veterans Memorial Medical Center, is named in his honor.

Awards
Johnson's awards and decorations included the following:

See also 

 List of members of the American Legion

References

External links

 

1882 births
1939 deaths
20th-century American politicians
United States Army personnel of World War I
Burials at Arlington National Cemetery
District attorneys in South Dakota
Military personnel from South Dakota
People from Cherokee, Iowa
People from Hyde County, South Dakota
People from Washington, D.C.
Politicians from Aberdeen, South Dakota
Recipients of the Distinguished Service Cross (United States)
Recipients of the Croix de Guerre 1914–1918 (France)
Republican Party members of the United States House of Representatives from South Dakota
South Dakota Attorneys General
South Dakota lawyers
United States Army officers
University of South Dakota alumni
20th-century American lawyers
Washington, D.C., Republicans
Military personnel from Iowa